Leleupaussus is a genus of beetle in the family Carabidae, with only one recognized species: L. tetramerus described by Luna de Carvalho in 1962.

References

Paussinae
Monotypic beetle genera